Mwandeti is an administrative ward in the Arusha Rural District  of the Arusha Region of Tanzania. According to the 2002 census, the ward has a total population of 14,643.

References

Wards of Arusha District
Wards of Arusha Region